The Marines Fly High is a 1940 action film, starring Richard Dix, Chester Morris and Lucille Ball and directed by George Nicholls, Jr. and Benjamin Stoloff from a story by A.C. Edington.

Plot
In 1940, the Central American cocoa plantation owned by American Joan Grant (Lucille Ball) needs protection from bandits led by El Vengador (John Eldredge). She asks the Marines stationed nearby under the command of Colonel Hill (Paul Harvey) for help. Lieutenants Danny Darrick (Richard Dix) and Jim Malone (Chester Morris) fly a mission to seek out the outlaws. Although they have orders to protect her, both men vie for Joan's affection.

John Henderson, the plantation foreman, is really El Vengador. He kidnaps Joan and sets a trap for the Marines he knows will try to rescue her. The two rivals eventually realize that to defeat the enemy, they will have to work together. When Malone is heading for an ambush, Derrick flies to his aid and rescues Joan.

Cast

 Richard Dix as Lt. Danny Darrick
 Chester Morris as Lt. Jim Malone
 Lucille Ball as Joan Grant
 Steffi Duna as Teresa
 John Eldredge as John Henderson / El Vengador
 Paul Harvey as Col. Hill
 Horace McMahon as Sgt. Monk O'Hara
 Dick Hogan as Cpl. Ted Haines
 Kirby Grant as Lt. Bob Hobbes (as Robert Stanton)
 Ann Shoemaker as Mrs. Hill
 Nestor Paiva as Pedro Fernandez

Production
Principal photography for The Marines Fly High took place from late October to December 2, 1939, on RKO sound stages. The backlots served as the locale for many of RKO's features set in more exotic locations. The use of U.S. Marine aircraft and the ability of both Dix and Morris to look comfortable as pilots led an air of authenticity to the programmer.

Reception
The Marines Fly High was a typical B movie whose action scenes received good notices from critics with Frank S. Nugent of The New York Times in a contemporary review, noting the film was "... a comfortably agile adventure story." A more recent appraisal by reviewer Frank Miller likewise described the film as "crammed" with action.

Film historian Richard Jewell in The RKO Story (1982), characterized the screenplay in The Marines Fly High by Jerry Cady and Lieutenant Commander A.J. Bolton as "dull" and "lacklustre".

Aviation film historian James H. Farmer in Celluloid Wings: The Impact of Movies on Aviation (1984) noted The Marines Fly High was punctuated by "the quick-paced roar of machine guns, rifles and airplane engines in this low-budget effort (that) fortunately leaves little time for a careful look at the lackluster plot."

See also
 List of American films of 1940

Notes

References

Bibliography

 Farmer, James H. Celluloid Wings: The Impact of Movies on Aviation. Blue Ridge Summit, Pennsylvania: Tab Books Inc., 1984. .
 Jewell, Richard B. The RKO Story. New Rochelle, New York: Arlington House, 1982. .
 Wynne, H. Hugh. The Motion Picture Stunt Pilots and Hollywood's Classic Aviation Movies. Missoula, Montana: Pictorial Histories Publishing Co., 1987. .

External links
 
 
 

American action adventure films
American aviation films
Films set in Central America
Films about the United States Marine Corps
American black-and-white films
Films directed by George Nicholls Jr.
Films directed by Benjamin Stoloff
RKO Pictures films
1940s action adventure films
1940s English-language films
1940s American films